Guāngmíng may refer to:

Newspapers 
Guangming Daily, national newspaper in China
Guang Ming Daily (Malaysia), Chinese-language newspaper based in Malaysia

Locations 
Guangming District, Shenzhen, Guangdong
Guangming Line, Shenzhen Metro
Guangming Peak, Huangshan, Anhui
Guangming Road station, Shanghai Metro in Kunshan, Jiangsu

Subdistricts
Guangming Subdistrict, Hefei, in Luyang District, Hefei, Anhui
Guangming Subdistrict, Beijing, in Shunyi District, Beijing
Guangming Subdistrict, Shenzhen, in Bao'an District, Shenzhen, Guangdong
Guangming Subdistrict, Tangshan, in Lubei District, Tangshan, Hebei
Guangming Subdistrict, Hegang, in Xiangyang District, Hegang, Heilongjiang
Guangming Subdistrict, Jiagedaqi District, in Jiagedaqi District, Daxing'anling Prefecture, Heilongjiang
Guangming Subdistrict, Helong, in Helong, Jilin
Guangming Subdistrict, Hunchun, in Hunchun, Jilin
Guangming Subdistrict, Meihekou, in Meihekou, Jilin
Guangming Subdistrict, Taonan, in Taonan, Jilin
Guangming Subdistrict, Tonghua, in Dongchang District, Tonghua, Jilin
Guangming Subdistrict, Chaoyang, Liaoning, in Shuangta District, Chaoyang, Liaoning
Guangming Subdistrict, Dalian, in Jinzhou District, Dalian, Liaoning
Guangming Subdistrict, Fushun, in Wanghua District, Fushun, Liaoning
Guangming Road Subdistrict, Handan, in Hanshan District, Handan, Hebei
Guangming Road Subdistrict, Pingdingshan, in Xinhua District, Pingdingshan, Henan
Guangming Road Subdistrict, Hohhot, in Huimin District, Hohhot, Inner Mongolia
Guangming Road Subdistrict, Zaozhuang, in Shizhong District, Zaozhuang, Shandong
Guangming Road Subdistrict, Artux, in Artux, Xinjiang

Historical eras
Guangming (880–881), era name of Emperor Xizong of Tang
Guangming (986–988?), era name of Duan Suying

Other
 Guang Ming Temple, a Buddhist temple in Orlando, Florida, USA
Kōmyō-ji (disambiguation), Buddhist temples, mostly in Japan; Kōmyō namely Guangming in Japanese.

See also
 Bright (disambiguation)
 Brightness (disambiguation)